Dunham may refer to:

Surname
 Dunham (surname), includes a list of people with the surname

Places
 Dunham, Kentucky, United States
 Dunham, Michigan, United States
 Dunham, Ohio, United States
 Dunham, Nottinghamshire, England
 Dunham, Quebec, Canada
 Dunham Castle, Greater Manchester, England
 Great Dunham, Norfolk, England
 Little Dunham, Norfolk, England
 Dunham Massey, Greater Manchester, England
 Dunham Massey Hall, an English country house
 Dunham on the Hill, Cheshire, England
 Dunham Town, Greater Manchester, England

Buildings
 Dunham Castle at Oaklawn Farm, Dunham Woods Riding Club, Wayne, Illinois
 Dunham House, near Kempton, Indiana
 Dunham's Mill, listed on the NRHP in Hunterdon County, New Jersey
 Jonathan Singletary Dunham House, Woodbridge Township, Middlesex County, New Jersey
 Dunham Tavern, the oldest building in Cleveland, Ohio
 Dunham Laboratory, Collegiate Gothic building on the campus of Yale University, gift of Austin C. Dunham

Other
 Dunham classification, a classification system for carbonate sedimentary rocks created by Robert J. Dunham
 Dunham expansion, an expression for rotational-vibrational energy level of diatomic molecules
 Dunham's Sports, chain of sporting goods stores
 USS Jason Dunham (DDG-109), an Arleigh Burke destroyer in the United States Navy
 Dunham Jackson, an American mathematician

See also
 Dunham Township (disambiguation)